Lanefield is a rural locality in the City of Ipswich, Queensland, Australia.

Geography
Western Creek, a tributary of the Bremer River, passes through Lanefield. Brandy Gully is a creek which rises in Lanefield and is a tributary of Western Creek.

The Main Line railway passes through Lanefield. Lanefield was once served by Lanefield railway station, but is now abandoned.

History 

The locality takes its name from the Lanefield railway station which in turn was named by the Queensland Railways Department after pioneer settlers John and Clara Lane.

By 1873 a Wesleyan Methodist Church had opened at Brandy Gully.

In 1873 a Baptist church opened in Brandy Gully / Lanefield.

In the 1890s, dairying was an important industry, so a cooperative dairy was built. It closed in 1905.

Coal mining took place from 1918 to circa 1970. Visual evidence of previous coal mining exists in the form of old workings throughout the area.

Education 
There are no schools in Lanefield. The nearest government primary schools are Ashwell State School in neighbouring Ashwell to the north and Rosewood State School in neighbouring Rosewood to the east. The nearest government secondary school is Rosewood State High School in Rosewood.

References

External links

City of Ipswich
Localities in Queensland